Bozquchan (also Romanized as Bozqūchān; also known as Bozqūjān) is a village in Takht-e Jolgeh Rural District, in the Central District of Firuzeh County, Razavi Khorasan Province, Iran. At the 2006 census, its population was 1,056, in 269 families.

References 

Populated places in Firuzeh County